The  superyacht Samaya was launched at the Feadship yard in Aalsmeer. British designer Redman Whiteley Dixon, designed both the interior and exterior of Samaya.

Design 
The hull is built out of steel while the superstructure is made out of aluminium with teak laid decks. She is powered by twin 1,850hp MTU 12V4000 M53 engines. The yacht is classed by Lloyd's Register and flagged in the Marshall Islands.

Accommodation 
Samaya's interior configuration has been designed to accommodate up to 12 guests overnight in 6 cabins, comprising a master suite, 1 VIP stateroom. She is also capable of carrying up to 16 crew on board.

See also
 List of motor yachts by length
 List of yachts built by Feadship

References

2017 ships
Motor yachts
Ships built in the Netherlands